Born to Sing may refer to:

Music 
 Born to Sing (Connie Smith album), 1966
 Born to Sing (En Vogue album), 1990
 Born to Sing, a 2010 album by Shanti Snyder
 Born to Sing: No Plan B, a 2012 album by Van Morrison
 "Born to Sing" (song), a 1978 song by Colm Wilkinson

Others 
 Born to Sing (1942 film), a 1942 American film written by Franz Schulz
 Born to Sing (2013 film), a 2013 South Korean film
 Almost Angels, a 1962 film, also called Born to Sing in the United Kingdom
 Born to Sing, a musical sequel to the musical Mama, I Want to Sing! and Mama, I Want to Sing! Part II

See also 
 Born to Sing the Blues, a 1957 album by Shirley Bassey